The 2018 season is Persib Bandung's 85th competitive season. Along with Liga 1, the club will compete in cup tournaments which yet to be announced.

Month by month review

December 2017
The team has announced Mario Gómez as a new coach. The Argentine coach was appointed to handle Persib in 2018 League 1 season
Roberto Carlos Mario Gomez was signed by Persib for two years.
Earlier in 2017 Roberto Carlos Mario Gomez was appointed as Malaysian national football team's head coach by FAM president Tunku Ismail Sultan Ibrahim, but he then asked for a higher salary and was therefore rejected as it was expensive.

January 2018
Some players were recruited by the coach, including Eka Ramdani, Oh In-kyun, Bojan Malisic, Airlangga Sutjipto, Victor Igbonefo and the coach recruited players from Persib U-19 which is the second winner of League 1 U-19 namely Muhammad Aqil Savik and Indra Mustafa. In spite of all that, Persib must also be left behind the flagship player who is the top scorer of Persib last season, Raphael Maitimo who decided to strengthen the other contestants of League 1, Madura United. Not only that, Persib also left behind importers from Japan Shohei Matsunaga, Jajang Sukmara which strengthens PSMS Medan, duo young players Angga Febryanto and Ahmad Baasith who strengthen different clubs, namely PS Tira Bantul and Persela Lamongan. Meanwhile, the fate of their strikers Sergio van Dijk and Tantan is still waiting for management's decision regarding their contract.

In their preseason event, Persib decided to follow the annual event of the Presidential Cup which they won in 2015 ago. They are in the "hell" group with other big teams, namely PSM Makassar, Sriwijaya F.C and second winner of League 2 PSMS Medan handled by their former coach, Djajang Nurdjaman. Persib Bandung undergo the first fight against Sriwijaya F.C. as well as the opening match of the 2018 Presidential Cup. Despite their dominant defeat of the visitors, they were able to clinch a 1–0 victory over the visitors.

Coaching staff

Source:

Squad information

First-team squad

Pre-season

Competitions

Overview 

{| class="wikitable" style="text-align: center"
|-
!rowspan=2|Competition
!colspan=8|Record
!rowspan=2|Started round
!rowspan=2|Final position / round
!rowspan=2|First match	
!rowspan=2|Last match
|-
!
!
!
!
!
!
!
!
|-
| Liga 1

| Matchday 1
| 4th
| 26 March 2018
| 8 December 2018
|-
| Piala Indonesia

| First Round
| In Progress
| 15 August 2018
| 
|-
! Total

|colspan=4|'Liga 1

 League table 

Results summary

Results by matchday

MatchesFirst roundSecond roundNotes:

Piala Indonesia

MatchesFirst roundSecond round'Notes:

Statistics

Squad appearances and goalsLast updated on 14 November 2018.|-
! colspan=14 style=background:#dcdcdc; text-align:center|Goalkeepers

|-
! colspan=14 style=background:#dcdcdc; text-align:center|Defenders

|-
! colspan=14 style=background:#dcdcdc; text-align:center|Midfielders

|-
! colspan=14 style=background:#dcdcdc; text-align:center|Forwards

|-
! colspan=14 style=background:#dcdcdc; text-align:center| Players who have made an appearance or had a squad number this season but have left the club 

|-
|}

Top scorersThe list is sorted by shirt number when total goals are equal.Clean SheetsThe list is sorted by shirt number when total clean sheets are equal.''

Disciplinary record
Includes all competitive matches. Players listed below made at least one appearance for Persib Bandung first squad during the season.

Last updated:  
Source: Soccerway
Only competitive matches 
 = Number of bookings;  = Number of sending offs after a second yellow card;  = Number of sending offs by a direct red card.

New contracts

Promotion from Persib Bandung U-19

In

Out

Loan Out

References

Persib Bandung
Persib Bandung seasons